Boyne Falls is a village in Charlevoix County in the U.S. state of Michigan.  The population was 358 at the 2020 census.  The village is located within Boyne Valley Township.

History
Boyne Falls was first settled with the coming of the Grand Rapids and Indiana Railroad in 1874.  In that year, A. D. Carpenter built the first store.  A post office opened in Boyne Falls on September 5, 1874 with William Nelson serving as the first postmaster.  The community was named by John Miller after the Boyne River, which has a nearby set of waterfalls.  The name itself came from another river in Ireland.  The community incorporated as a village in 1893. 

The railway line is now operated by the Great Lakes Central Railroad, although the station in Boyne Falls has been closed since 1973. 

The village is home to the Boyne Falls Polish Festival, which takes place in the first week of August.  The 47th annual festival took place in 2022.

Geography

Boyne Mountain Resort is a ski area located just southeast of the village limits near Boyne Mountain Airport.  The village is located along the Boyne River, near the junction of the river's north and south branches.

Major highways
  runs south–north through the western portion of the village.
  enters the village briefly before having its southern terminus at US 131
  is county-designated highway that runs concurrently with M-75 and then US 131 before turning east along Thumb Lake Road at the northern border of the village.

Climate
This climatic region is typified by large seasonal temperature differences, with warm to hot (and often humid) summers and cold (sometimes severely cold) winters.  According to the Köppen Climate Classification system, Boyne Falls has a humid continental climate, abbreviated "Dfb" on climate maps.

Demographics

2010 census
As of the census of 2010, there were 294 people, 133 households, and 80 families residing in the village. The racial makeup of the village was 95.2% White, 0.7% African American, 1.0% Native American, 0.3% Asian, and 2.7% from two or more races. Hispanic or Latino of any race were 0.7% of the population.

There were 133 households, of which 27.8% had children under the age of 18 living with them, 39.1% were married couples living together, 15.0% had a female householder with no husband present, 6.0% had a male householder with no wife present, and 39.8% were non-families. 33.8% of all households were made up of individuals, and 15% had someone living alone who was 65 years of age or older. The average household size was 2.21 and the average family size was 2.73.

The median age in the village was 41.7 years. 20.7% of residents were under the age of 18; 10.6% were between the ages of 18 and 24; 23.4% were from 25 to 44; 32% were from 45 to 64; and 13.3% were 65 years of age or older. The gender makeup of the village was 47.3% male and 52.7% female.

2000 census
As of the census of 2000, there were 370 people, 158 households, and 97 families residing in the village. The racial makeup of the village was 97.84% White, 1.35% Native American, 0.27% Asian, and 0.54% from two or more races. Hispanic or Latino of any race were 0.27% of the population.

There were 158 households, out of which 31.6% had children under the age of 18 living with them, 44.3% were married couples living together, 10.1% had a female householder with no husband present, and 38.0% were non-families. 32.3% of all households were made up of individuals, and 11.4% had someone living alone who was 65 years of age or older.  The average household size was 2.34 and the average family size was 2.96.

In the village, the population was spread out, with 25.4% under the age of 18, 10.8% from 18 to 24, 34.1% from 25 to 44, 17.6% from 45 to 64, and 12.2% who were 65 years of age or older.  The median age was 34 years. For every 100 females, there were 96.8 males.  For every 100 females age 18 and over, there were 102.9 males.

The median income for a household in the village was $32,143, and the median income for a family was $40,250. Males had a median income of $34,167 versus $16,103 for females. The per capita income for the village was $15,027.  About 4.5% of families and 10.3% of the population were below the poverty line, including 5.9% of those under age 18 and 17.9% of those age 65 or over.

Education
The village of Boyne Falls is served by its own school district, Boyne Falls Public School District, which also serves portions of several adjacent townships.  The district is headquartered in the village, while its main campus is located just to the west along M-75.

Images

References

Villages in Charlevoix County, Michigan
Villages in Michigan
Populated places established in 1874
1874 establishments in Michigan